The Iraq FA Cup, known as the Iraq Cup in Arabic, is an annual knockout football competition in men's domestic Iraqi football. First held in the 1948–49 season for clubs and institutions before returning in 1975–76 for clubs only, it is organised by the Iraq Football Association. The tournament begins with several rounds played between lower division clubs, twelve of which advance to the Round of 32, where the Iraqi Premier League clubs are entered. This is followed by the Round of 16, the quarter-finals, the semi-finals and the final which is played as a single leg in Baghdad.

The winners of the competition are awarded a place in the next season's AFC Cup group stage as well as qualifying for the Iraqi Super Cup where they play against the league champions at the start of the following season (or the league runners-up, if the cup winners have won the double).

Al-Karkh are the current holders, having beaten Al-Kahrabaa 2–1 in the 2022 final.

History

Foundation and development 
The Iraq Football Association was founded on 8 October 1948 and within its first week it had decided to hold a national knockout cup called the Iraq Football Association Cup for clubs and institute-representative teams. The tournament kicked off on 21 January 1949 and culminated in Sharikat Naft Al-Basra winning the final on 7 April. For the next 26 years, cup tournaments for clubs and institutions were played at a regional level (such as the Iraq FA Baghdad Cup which was played in the 1973–74 season) until the national knockout cup competition returned as a clubs-only competition in 1975 as the Iraq Cup.

Al-Shaab Stadium was chosen by the Iraq FA to host the cup finals as it was able to accommodate the large number of spectators in the capital city. The first club to win the double was Al-Zawraa, winning the 1975–76 Iraqi National League and the 1975–76 Iraq FA Cup. Overall, Al-Zawraa have eight doubles while Al-Quwa Al-Jawiya have three, Al-Rasheed have two and Al-Talaba have one.

In the 1976–77 season, the tournament was not held due to scheduling difficulties, and in the 1984–85 season, it was cancelled at the semi-final stage to allow the Iraq national team to prepare for their 1986 FIFA World Cup qualifying matches, which was the same reason why the 1984–85 Iraqi National League was cancelled. The cup was also not held the following season, but returned for the 1986–87 campaign. It was also not held in the 2000–01 season due to scheduling difficulties.

The 2003 edition of the Iraq FA Cup Final was not hosted in Al-Shaab Stadium; instead it was hosted in Erbil at the Franso Hariri Stadium for security reasons. The tournament was not held from 2003–04 up until 2011–12 as the Iraq War caused travel problems for clubs and difficulties with scheduling. The cup finally returned in the 2012–13 season, but was eventually cancelled midway through due to scheduling difficulties with the 2012–13 Iraqi Elite League.

It was not held again until the FA decided to hold it in the 2015–16 season. This time, the cup was not cancelled, although a large number of Premier League teams withdrew from the competition. The 2016 Iraq FA Cup Final was the first Iraq FA Cup final held for 13 years, and was played between Baghdad rivals Al-Zawraa and Al-Quwa Al-Jawiya with the latter winning 2–0. In the first edition of the tournament, there were 25 teams; by the 2021–22 season, there was an all-time high of 168 teams in the tournament.

Eligibility
The competition is open to clubs from Level 1 to Level 4 of the Iraqi football league system which meet the eligibility criteria.

Competition format

2021–22 season

Overview
Beginning in September, the competition proceeded as a knockout tournament throughout, consisting of eight rounds, a quarter-final, semi-final and then a final. A system of byes ensured clubs in Levels 1 and 2 entered the competition at later stages. There was no seeding, the fixtures in each round being determined by a random draw. The first six rounds were qualifiers, with the draws organised on a regional basis. The next five rounds were the "proper" rounds where all clubs were in one draw.

Schedule
Entrants from the bottom two levels (3 and 4) began the competition in the qualifying rounds. Clubs from higher levels were then added in later rounds, as per the table below. The qualifying rounds were regionalised to reduce the travel costs for lower division sides.

Trophy

Current design from 2022
The Iraq FA Cup trophy is designed in the shape of a tree with eighteen roots, branches and leaves encircling a ball. The number eighteen refers to the eighteen governorates of Iraq. The image of Iraq as a tree is a metaphor suggesting that the nation may fall ill (just like a tree in autumn) but will inevitably bloom again. Unveiled on 6 April 2022, the trophy is the work of the famous sculptor Ahmed Albahrani who also designed the 2015 World Men's Handball Championship trophy.

The trophy is kept by the Iraq Football Association and only a replica model is given permanently to the winning club.

Records and statistics

Final
Most wins: 16, Al-Zawraa (1976, 1979, 1981, 1982, 1989, 1990, 1991, 1993, 1994, 1995, 1996, 1998, 1999, 2000, 2017, 2019)
Most consecutive wins: 4, Al-Zawraa (1993, 1994, 1995, 1996)
Most appearances in a final: 19, Al-Zawraa (1976, 1979, 1981, 1982, 1988, 1989, 1990, 1991, 1993, 1994, 1995, 1996, 1998, 1999, 2000, 2016, 2017, 2019, 2021)
Most appearances without winning: 5, Al-Shorta (1978, 1996, 1997, 2002, 2003)
Most appearances without losing: 2, Al-Rasheed (1987, 1988)
Biggest win: 5 goals, Al-Zawraa 5–0 Al-Baladiyat (1976)
Most goals in a final: 5, Al-Zawraa 5–0 Al-Baladiyat (1976)
Most defeats: 6, Al-Talaba (1980, 1981, 1982, 1993, 1994, 1999)

All rounds

Team
Biggest win: Al-Jaish 14–0 Babil (12 September 1987)
Most clubs competing for trophy in a season: 168 (2021–22)

Individual
Most goals by a player in a single tournament: 14, Hashim Ridha (1998–99)
Most goals by a player in a single game: 5 – joint record:
Saeed Nouri (for Al-Shorta v. Salahaddin, 1988–89)
Sahib Abbas (for Al-Zawraa v. Al-Falluja, 1993–94)
Mahmoud Karim (for Al-Zawraa v. Al-Qasim, 1997–98)
Mohammed Khoshnaw (for Erbil v. Makhmur, 1998–99)
Mahmoud Kadhim (for Erbil v. Makhmur, 1998–99)
Fastest goal: 6 seconds, Saif Raheem (for Al-Sulaikh v. Al-Jinsiya, 11 November 2021)

Cup runs and giant killings
Lower division teams have knocked out top-flight sides on numerous occasions. In the cup's first season in 1948–49, Baghdad top-flight side Wizarat Al-Maarif lost 3–2 to second-tier team Al-Tayour Al-Zarqaa in the second round. In the 1977–78 edition of the cup, the second team of Al-Tayaran (Al-Tayaran B), who played in the Iraq Division One, eliminated Al-Jaish, who finished in fourth place in the 1977–78 Iraqi National League, from the first round of the cup with a 1–0 win. In the same edition, Al-Zawraa were defeated by Division One team Al-Bahri in the quarter-finals, 2–1. In the 1982–83 edition, Division One club Al-Hudood knocked out Arab Club Champions Cup holders Al-Shorta 7–6 on penalties.

In the 1989–90 edition, Al-Rasheed, who had won the Premier League in each of the past three seasons and the FA Cup in two of the past three seasons, were defeated by Division One club Al-Tijara 3–2 on aggregate in the Round of 16. In the 1992–93 edition, Al-Tijara pulled off another shock by defeating Al-Shorta in the first round, 2–1, and they also defeated another top-flight team in Al-Jaish in the Round of 16 with the same result. The 2016–17 Iraq FA Cup saw two major upsets in the Round of 32 as Al-Naft and Al-Shorta lost 3–2 and 3–1 to Division One clubs Al-Sinaa and Al-Jaish respectively, both at home.

Al-Minaa are the only team to have participated in every edition of the tournament from 1948–49 up until 2021–22.

Winners and finalists

Notes

Performance by team

Clubs

Institutions

List of winning managers

Most successful managers

References

External links
 Iraq Football Association

 
Football competitions in Iraq
National association football cups